Sumud Acoustic EP is an EP by Niyaz. Announced on September 20, 2012 as a companion piece to the 2012 album Sumud, the EP contains six songs, three of which are renditions of songs from Sumud.

Early announcements for Sumud suggested that the album would be released as a double album with an electronic disc and acoustic disc, but eventually the two were split into separate projects.

Track listing

 Sahar (4:15)
 Nalona (5:13)
 Mazaar (feat. A. R. Rahman) (acoustic) (5:52)
 Vafa (Acoustic) (6:12)
 Parishaan (acoustic) (3:19)
 Nasseem (4:45)

References

Niyaz albums
2013 albums